Events during the year 1114 in Italy.

Deaths
 Richard of Salerno

Births
 Gerard of Cremona

Sources
 Beech, George. A Norman-Italian Adventurer in the East: Richard of Salerno, 1993
 
 Campbell, Donald (2001). Arabian Medicine and Its Influence on the Middle Ages. Routledge. (Reprint of the London, 1926 edition).  .
 Haskins, Charles Homer.  The Renaissance of the Twelfth Century.  Cambridge: Harvard Univ. Pr., 1927.  See especially chapter 9, "The Translators from Greek and Arabic".
 Katz, Victor J. (1998). A History of Mathematics: An Introduction. Addison Wesley.

References 

Italy
Years of the 12th century in Italy
Italy